Croydon is a town in Sullivan County, New Hampshire, United States. The population was 801 at the 2020 census.

History 
Incorporated in 1763, the town takes its name from Croydon, a suburb of London, England.

Croydon was home to Ruel Durkee, a powerful 19th century political boss in the state. The town of "Coniston" in the 1906 best-selling novel of the same name, by American author Winston Churchill, is based on Croydon, and Durkee was portrayed as "Jethro Bass". The local Coniston General Store is named after the novel, as are YMCA Camp Coniston and Lake Coniston in the eastern part of the town.

Geography 
The North Branch Sugar River flows southward through the east-central part of the town. Croydon lies fully within the Connecticut River watershed.

Croydon is home to Corbin Park, one of the largest private game reserves in New England. The  fenced-in expanse of woodlands and mountainous terrain features bison, European boar and elk and extends into neighboring towns.

Adjacent municipalities
 Grantham, New Hampshire (north)
 Springfield, New Hampshire (northeast)
 Sunapee, New Hampshire (east)
 Newport, New Hampshire (south)
 Cornish, New Hampshire (west)
 Plainfield, New Hampshire (northwest)

Demographics 

As of the census of 2000, there were 661 people, 264 households, and 194 families living in the town.  The population density was 17.8 people per square mile (6.9/km2).  There were 354 housing units at an average density of 9.5 per square mile (3.7/km2).  The racial makeup of the town was 97.43% White, 0.45% Native American, 0.15% Asian, 0.76% from other races, and 1.21% from two or more races. Hispanic or Latino of any race were 0.61% of the population.

There were 264 households, out of which 29.2% had children under the age of 18 living with them, 58.0% were married couples living together, 8.3% had a female householder with no husband present, and 26.5% were non-families. 19.3% of all households were made up of individuals, and 8.7% had someone living alone who was 65 years of age or older.  The average household size was 2.50 and the average family size was 2.71.

In the town, the population was spread out, with 22.7% under the age of 18, 4.7% from 18 to 24, 30.4% from 25 to 44, 30.0% from 45 to 64, and 12.3% who were 65 years of age or older.  The median age was 41 years. For every 100 females, there were 109.2 males.  For every 100 females age 18 and over, there were 102.0 males.

The median income for a household in the town was $49,688, and the median income for a family was $50,556. Males had a median income of $31,992 versus $26,544 for females. The per capita income for the town was $21,403.  About 2.5% of families and 4.9% of the population were below the poverty line, including 5.0% of those under age 18 and 9.7% of those age 65 or over.

Politics 
In recent decades, Croydon has supported Republicans in presidential elections.

In 2022, Croydon made headlines after citizens organized an emergency town meeting against a school board amendment that had cut the public school budget by more than half. Repeal of the amendment passed by 377-2. The story of the repeal was covered on This American Life on July 29, 2022 .

Notable people
 Augusta Cooper Bristol (1835–1910), poet, lecturer
 Jonas Cutting (1800–1876), Maine Supreme Judicial Court justice
 Wallace L. Dow (1844–1911), architect
 Whitman G. Ferrin (1818–1896), attorney and politician
 Samuel Read Hall (1795–1877), educator
 Gershom Powers (1789–1831), United States representative
 Baron Stow (1801–1869), Baptist minister

References

External links 
 
 New Hampshire Economic and Labor Market Information Bureau Profile

Towns in Sullivan County, New Hampshire
Towns in New Hampshire